The languages of Ethiopia include the official languages of Ethiopia, its national and regional languages, and a large number of minority languages, as well as foreign languages.

Overview

There are 92 individual languages indigenous to Ethiopia according to Ethnologue, with the 1994 Ethiopian census indicating that some 77 tongues were spoken locally. Most of these languages belong to the Afroasiatic family (Semitic and Cushitic languages; Omotic languages are also spoken, but their classification as Afroasiatic remains disputed). Additionally, Nilo-Saharan languages are spoken by what the government calls the "Nilotic" people, though scholars distinguish Nilotic from the Surmic languages, Gumuz languages, and Koman languages spoken in Ethiopia.

Of the languages spoken in Ethiopia, 91 are living and 1 is extinct. 41 of the living languages are institutional, 14 are developing, 18 are vigorous, 8 are in danger of extinction, and 5 are near extinction.

Charles A. Ferguson proposed the Ethiopian language area, characterized by shared grammatical and phonological features in 1976. This sprachbund includes the Afroasiatic languages of Ethiopia, not the Nilo-Saharan languages. In 2000, Mauro Tosco questioned the validity of Ferguson's original proposal. There is still no agreement among scholars on this point, but Tosco has at least weakened Ferguson's original claim.

English is the most widely spoken foreign language and is the medium of instruction in secondary schools and universities. Amharic was the language of primary school instruction but has been replaced in many areas by local languages such as Oromo and Tigrinya.

After the fall of the Derg in 1991, the 1995 Constitution of Ethiopia granted all ethnic groups the right to develop their languages and to establish first language primary education systems. This is a marked change to the language policies of previous governments in Ethiopia.

In terms of writing systems, Ethiopia's principal orthography is the Ge'ez script. Employed as an abugida for several of the country's languages. For instance, it was the primary writing system for Afan Oromo until 1991. The Ethiopic script first came into usage in the sixth and fifth centuries BC as an abjad to transcribe the Semitic Ge'ez language. Ge'ez now serves as the liturgical language of the Ethiopian and Eritrean Orthodox and Catholic Churches. Other writing systems have also been used over the years by different Ethiopian communities. These include Arabic script for writing some Ethiopian languages spoken by Muslim populations and Sheikh Bakri Sapalo's script for Oromo. Today, many Cushitic, Omotic, and Nilo-Saharan languages are written in Roman/Latin script.

Languages
According to data from the 2021 Ethnologue, the largest first languages are:
Oromo speakers numbering more than 36 million speakers;
Amharic speakers numbering 31,800,000;
Somali speakers numbering 6,720,000;
Tigrinya speakers numbering 6,390,000;
Sidama speakers numbering 4,340,000;
Wolaytta speakers numbering 2,380,000;
Sebat Bet Gurage speakers numbering 2,170,000;
Afar speakers numbering 1,840,000.
 
Arabic, which also belongs to the Afroasiatic family, is spoken in some areas of Ethiopia. Many Muslim Ethiopians are also able to speak Arabic because of their religious background.

English is the most widely spoken foreign language which is also taught in many schools.

Special status of Amharic
Amharic has been the official working language of Ethiopian courts and its armed forces, trade and everyday communications since the late 12th century. Although now it is only one of the five official languages of Ethiopia, together with Oromo, Somali, Afar, and Tigrinya - until 2020 Amharic was the only Ethiopian working language of the federal government. Amharic is the most widely spoken and written language in Ethiopia.  As of 2018, Amharic was spoken by 31.8 million native speakers in Ethiopia with over 25 million secondary speakers in the nation.

Although additional languages are used, Amharic is still predominantly spoken by all ethnic groups in Addis Ababa. Additionally, three million emigrants outside of Ethiopia speak Amharic. Most of the Ethiopian Jewish communities in Ethiopia and Israel speak it too.

In Washington DC, Amharic became one of the six non-English languages in the Language Access Act of 2004, which allows government services and education in Amharic.

Furthermore, Amharic is considered a holy language by the Rastafari religion and is widely used among its followers worldwide.

Afroasiatic

Afroasiatic
 Ethiopian Semitic
 North Ethiopic
 Tigrinya language (also in Eritrea)
 Ge'ez language (also in Eritrea:extinct, liturgical)
 South Ethiopic 
 Transverse
 Amharic language
 Argobba language
 Harari language
 East Gurage languages
 Silt'e language (Ulbareg, Inneqor, Wolane)
 Zay language
 Outer South Ethiopic 
 Gafat language (extinct)
 North Gurage languages
 Soddo language, incl. dialect Goggot (Dobi)
 West Gurage languages
 Chaha (Sebat Bet Gurage)
 Ezha language
 Gumer language
 Gura language
 Inor language
 Gyeto language
 Endegen language
 Mesmes language (extinct)
 Mesqan language
 Muher language
 Cushitic
 Agaw languages
 Awngi language, incl. dialect Kunfal
 Qimant language
 Xamtanga language
 East Cushitic
 Highland East Cushitic languages
 Burji language
 Sidaama-Hadiyya-Kambaata
 Alaba language
 Gedeo language
 Hadiyya language
 Kambaata language
 Libido language
 Sidamo language
Lowland East Cushitic languages
 Somali language  (also in Somalia, Somaliland, Djibouti, and Kenya)
 Saho-Afar
 Afar language  (also in Eritrea and in Djibouti)
 Saho language (also in Eritrea and in Ethiopia spoken by the Irob people)
 Southern Lowland East Cushitic
 Mainstream Lowland East Cushitic
 Omo-Tana
 Arbore language
 Baiso language
 Daasanach language (also in Kenya)
 Oromoid
 Konso language
 Dirasha language
 Oromo language  (also in Kenya)
 Transversal Lowland East Cushitic
 Bussa language
 Gawwada language
 Tsamai language
 Omotic* (AA classification uncertain)
 Aari language  	
 Anfillo language
 Bambassi language
 Basketo language
 Bench language
 Boro language, also called Shinasha
 Chara language
 Dawro language
 Dime language
 Dizi language
 Dorze language
 Gamo language
 Ganza language
 Gayil language
 Gofa language
 Hamer-Banna
 Hozo language
 Kachama-Ganjule language
 Kafa language
 Karo language
 Koorete language
 Male language
 Melo language
 Nayi language
 Oyda language
 Seze language
 Shekkacho language
 Sheko language
 Wolaytta language
 Yemsa language
 Zayse-Zergulla language

Nilo-Saharan
In Ethiopia, the term "Nilotic" is often used to refer to Nilo-Saharan languages and their communities. However, in academic linguistics, "Nilotic" is only part of "Nilo-Saharan", a segment of the larger Nilo-Saharan family.
 
Nilo-Saharan
 Anuak language  (also in South Sudan)
 Berta language
 Gumuz language
 Kacipo-Balesi language  (also in South Sudan)
 Komo language
 Kunama language (also in Eritrea)
 Kwama language
 Kwegu language
 Majang language
 Me'en language
 Murle language  (also in South Sudan)
 Mursi language
 Nuer language  (also in South Sudan)
 Nyangatom language
 Opuuo language
 Shabo language
 Suri language
 Uduk language  (also in Sudan)

Unclassified
 Weyto language (extinct — could have been Cushitic or Semitic)
 Ongota (moribund — possibly Omotic or an independent branch of Afroasiatic or not Afroasiatic at all)
 Rer Bare language (extinct — maybe Bantu)

Endangered languages
A number of Ethiopian languages are endangered: they may not be spoken in one or two generations and may become extinct, victims of language death, as Weyto, Gafat, and Mesmes have and Ongota very soon will.  The factors that contribute to language death are complex, so it is not easy to estimate which or how many languages are most vulnerable.  Hudson wrote, "Assuming that a language with fewer than 10,000 speakers is endangered, or likely to become extinct within a generation", there are 22 endangered languages in Ethiopia (1999:96).  However, a number of Ethiopian languages never have had populations even that high, so it is not clear that this is an appropriate way to calculate the number of endangered languages in Ethiopia.  The real number may be lower or higher.  The new language policies after the 1991 revolution have strengthened the use of a number of languages.  Publications specifically about endangered languages in Ethiopia include: Appleyard (1998), Hayward (1988), and Zelealem (1998a,b, 2004)

References

Further reading
Appleyard, David. 1998. Language Death: The Case of Qwarenya (Ethiopia). In Endangered Languages in Africa, edited by Matthias Brenzinger. Köln: Rüdiger Köppe.
Ferguson, Charles. 1976. The Ethiopian Language Area.  Language In Ethiopia, ed. by M. Lionel Bender, J. Donald Bowen, R.L. Cooper, Charles A. Ferguson, pp. 63–76.  Oxford: Oxford University Press.
Hayward, Richard J. 1998. The Endangered Languages of Ethiopia: What's at Stake for the Linguist? In Endangered Languages in Africa, edited by Matthias Brenzinger, 17–38. Köln: Rüdiger Köppe.
Hudson, Grover. 1999. Linguistic Analysis of the 1994 Ethiopian Census. Northeast African Studies Vol. 6, No. 3 (New Series), pp. 89–108.
Hudson, Grover. 2004. Languages of Ethiopia and Languages of the 1994 Ethiopian Census. Aethiopica: International Journal of Ethiopian and Eritrean Studies 7: 160–172.
Leslau, Wolf. 1965. An annotated bibliography of the Semitic languages of Ethiopia. The Hague: Mouton.
Tosco, Mauro. 2000. Is There an ‘Ethiopian Language Area’? Anthropological Linguistics 42,3: 329–365.
Unseth, Peter. 1990. Linguistic bibliography of the Non-Semitic languages of Ethiopia.  East Lansing: African Studies Center, Michigan State University. (Classification charts, pp. 21 ff.)
Zelealem Leyew. 1998a. An Ethiopian Language on the Verge of Extinction. International Journal of the Sociology of Language 134: 69–84.
Zelealem Leyew. 1998b. Some Structural Signs of Obsolescence in K’emant. In Endangered Languages in Africa. Edited by Matthias Brenzinger. Köln: Rüdiger Köppe.
Zelealem Leyew. 2004. The fate of endangered languages in Ethiopia. On the margins of nations: endangered languages and linguistic rights. proceedings of the eighth FEL Conference, Eds. Joan A. Argenter & Robert McKenna Brown, 35–45.  Bath: Foundation for Endangered Languages.

External links
Ethnologue page on Ethiopian languages
PanAfriL10n page on Ethiopia
Bibliographic database of Ethiopian languages by SIL Ethiopia
Endangered languages of Ethiopia at Endangered Languages Project